The cone-billed tanager (Conothraupis mesoleuca) is a species of bird in the family Thraupidae.
It is endemic to Brazil.

It was described on the basis of a single male specimen collected in Mato Grosso, Brazil, in 1938. No other individuals were collected or seen and some feared the bird had become extinct, while others speculated that it possibly only was an aberrant black-and-white tanager (unlikely, as the black-and-white tanager only occurs far from the region where the cone-billed was collected). In 2003, it was rediscovered by D. Buzzetti in gallery woodland and Cerrado in the Emas National Park, only to be independently rediscovered at the same locality in 2004 by B. A. Carlos.

The male resembles the male black-and-white tanager, but differs by its black flanks and its strikingly whitish-grey bill (this has faded in the type specimen, currently kept in MNHN, where it appears dark dusky-horn). Also, the crissum (the area around the cloaca) of the male is black and frequently has white spots. The plumage of the female is closer to that of the female ultramarine grosbeak than that of the female black-and-white tanager, but a longer, more detailed description is currently being prepared for publication.

References

 BirdLife International 2007. Data for Conothraupis mesoleuca
 Buzzetti, D., and B. A. Carlos (2005). A redescoberta do tiê-bicudo Conothraupis mesoleuca. (Berlioz, 1939). Atualidades Ornithológicas 127: Front, pp. 2 and 16–17.

cone-billed tanager
Birds of the Amazon Basin
Birds of Brazil
Endemic birds of Brazil
cone-billed tanager
cone-billed tanager
Taxonomy articles created by Polbot